Jowkar District is a district (bakhsh) in Malayer County, Hamadan Province, Iran. At the 2006 census, its population was 52,445, in 12,332 families.  The District has two cities: Jowkar and Azandarian. The District has four rural districts (dehestan): Almahdi Rural District, Jowkar Rural District, Tork-e Gharbi Rural District, and Tork-e Sharqi Rural District.

References 

Malayer County
Districts of Hamadan Province